Daar Ughad Baye is an Indian Marathi language television series produced by Tejendra Neswankar under the banner of Trrump Carrd Production. It is airing on Zee Marathi from 19 September 2022. It stars Saniya Chaudhari, Roshan Vichare and Sharad Ponkshe in lead roles.

Plot
This show narrates the story of a girl, Mukta, who goes to the Nagarkar mansion to play the Sambal on behalf of her father. Mukta is forced to take up her father's position as a drum player. When she gets married into an aristocratic family, she struggles to maintain a balance in her personal and professional life.

Special episode (1 hour) 
 20 November 2022
 11 December 2022
 8 January 2023
 5 February 2023
 12 March 2023

Cast

Main 
 Saniya Chaudhari as Mukta Aatmaram Shinde
 Roshan Vichare as Sarang Raosaheb Nagarkar

Recurring 
Sarang's family
 Sharad Ponkshe as Raosaheb Nanasaheb Nagarkar (Dada)
 Suhas Paranjape as Vaijayanti Raosaheb Nagarkar
 Kishori Ambiye as Ambika Nanasaheb Nagarkar
 Maya Jadhav as Chandrakala Imampurkar / Chandrakala Nanasaheb Nagarkar (Chandra)
 Mohiniraj Gatne as Bhausaheb Nanasaheb Nagarkar
 Madhavi Dabholkar as Madhavi Bhausaheb Nagarkar
 Bhagyashri Dalavi as Renuka Raosaheb Nagarkar
 Shahu Savekar as Yuvraj Bhausaheb Nagarkar
 Gauri Pendse as Gayatri Bhausaheb Nagarkar

Mukta's family
 Kishor Chaughule as Aatmaram Shinde
 Mrinalini Jawale as Kusum Aatmaram Shinde
 Sahil Joshi as Gajya Aatmaram Shinde
 Vaishnavi Ghodke as Bhakti Aatmaram Shinde

Others
 Shraddha Chitralekha as Aarya Prataprao Nimbalkar
 Mohan Khambete as Prataprao Nimbalkar
 Chitra Khare as Sumati Prataprao Nimbalkar
 Chinmay Patwardhan as Papya
 Yogeshkumar Powar as Bhairu
 Geeta Panchal as Asha
 Mahima Mhatre as Jaya
 Laxmikant Dabholkar as Devdatta
 Atharva Marathe as Ved
 Reena Pimpale as Godamai

Adaptations

References

External links 
 Daar Ughad Baye at ZEE5

Marathi-language television shows
2022 Indian television series debuts
Zee Marathi original programming